Lokman Gör (born 15 December 1990) is a Turkish professional footballer who plays as a defender for Bucaspor 1928.

Professional career
Lokman spent most of his early career in the second division of Turkey, but helped Antalyaspor get promoted to the Süper Lig for the 2015–16 season. He made his professional debut in a 3–2 win over İstanbul Başakşehir F.K. on 15 August 2015. Lokman transferred to Göztepe and helped them get promoted to the Süper Lig for the 2017–18 season.

International career
Lokman first represented Turkey A2 in a friendly tournament 4–4 tie with Slovakia B.

References

External links
 
 
 

1990 births
Sportspeople from Rize
Living people
Turkish footballers
Turkey B international footballers
Association football defenders
Pendikspor footballers
Antalyaspor footballers
Samsunspor footballers
Ankaraspor footballers
Şanlıurfaspor footballers
Göztepe S.K. footballers
Büyükşehir Belediye Erzurumspor footballers
Alanyaspor footballers
Altay S.K. footballers
Bandırmaspor footballers
Süper Lig players
TFF First League players
TFF Second League players